Newtoniellidae is a family of minute sea snails, marine gastropod mollusks or micromollusks in the superfamily Triphoroidea.

It contains the following subfamilies :
 † Gothicispira Maxwell, 1988
 † Miopila Finlay, 1926 
 Retilaskeya B. A. Marshall, 1978
 Adelacerithiinae
 Adelacerithium Ludbrook, 1941
 Ataxocerithiinae
 Ataxocerithium Tate, 1894
 Eumetulinae
 Cerithiopsida Bartsch, 1911
 Embrionalia Golikov, 1988
 Eumetula Thiele, 1912
 Furukawaia Kuroda & Habe in Habe, 1961
 Marshallaskeya Gründel, 1980
 Laeocochlidinae
 Laeocochlis Dunker & Metzger, 1875
 Sasamocochlis Gründel, 1980
 Newtoniellinae
 Cerithiella Verrill, 1882
 Granulotriforis Kosuge, 1967
 Paramendax A. W. B. Powell, 1937: synonym of Trituba Jousseaume, 1884
 Trituba Jousseaume, 1884
Genera brought into synonymy 
 Altispecula Powell, 1930: synonym of Eumetula (Altispecula) Powell, 1930 represented as Eumetula Thiele, 1912
 Binda Laseron, 1951: synonym of Cerithiella Verrill, 1882
 Cerithiolinum Locard, 1903: synonym of Cerithiella Verrill, 1882
 Chasteria Iredale, 1915: synonym of Cerithiella Verrill, 1882
 Eumeta Mörch, 1868: synonym of Eumetula Thiele, 1912
 Euseila Cotton, 1951: synonym of Cerithiella Verrill, 1882
 Furukuwaia: synonym of Furukawaia Kuroda & Habe in Habe, 1961
 Geminataxum Iredale, 1936: synonym of Ataxocerithium Tate, 1894
 Laiocochlis Dunker & Metzger, 1874: synonym of Laeocochlis Dunker & Metzger, 1874
 Laskeya Iredale, 1918: synonym of Eumetula Thiele, 1912
 Lovenella G. O. Sars, 1878: synonym of Cerithiella Verrill, 1882
 Newtonia Cossman, 1892: synonym of Cerithiella Verrill, 1882
 Newtoniella Cossman, 1893: synonym of Cerithiella Verrill, 1882
 Stilus Jeffreys, 1885: synonym of Cerithiella Verrill, 1882
 Tauroforis Sacco, 1895: synonym of Trituba Jousseaume, 1884

References

 
Ptenoglossa
Gastropod families